Fairfield Dutch Reformed Church is a historic church on Fairfield Road in Fairfield Township, Essex County, New Jersey, United States.

The congregation was established in 1720 by Dutch settlers. The building dates to 1804 and was added to the National Register of Historic Places in 1975.

See also 
 National Register of Historic Places listings in Essex County, New Jersey

References

Reformed Church in America churches in New Jersey
Churches on the National Register of Historic Places in New Jersey
Churches completed in 1804
19th-century Reformed Church in America church buildings
Churches in Essex County, New Jersey
National Register of Historic Places in Essex County, New Jersey
1720 establishments in New Jersey